The 1912–13 French Ice Hockey Championship was the fourth edition of the French Ice Hockey Championship, the national ice hockey championship in France. Club des Patineurs de Paris won their third championship.

Final
 Chamonix Hockey Club - Club des Patineurs de Paris 1:12

External links
Season on hockeyarchives.info

French
1912–13 in French ice hockey
Ligue Magnus seasons